This page lists the discography of Rah Digga.

Albums

Studio albums

Unreleased albums
Everything Is a Story (2004)

Mixtapes

Group albums

Singles

As lead artist

"Tight" (1999)
"Imperial" (1999) #16 Hot Rap Singles
"Break Fool" (2000) #15 Hot Rap Singles
"Mirror Mirror" (2001) 
"Party and Bullshit 2003" (2003)
"Make It Hot"/"See It in Your Eyes" (2005)
"New Shit" (2008)
"Warning Shots" (2010) (street leak)
"This Ain't No Lil' Kid Rap" (2010)
"Classic" (2010)
"Made MC" (2011)
"Storm Coming" (2014)
"Angela Davis" (2014)

Guest appearances

Notes

References

External links
Rah Digga Bandcamp page
Rah Digga on Discogs
Greatest Female Rappers of All Time

Discographies of American artists
Hip hop discographies